Ann Kimberly Orrison-Germain (born June 29, 1961) is an American former soccer player who was a member of the United States women's national soccer team from 1985 to 1986.

She played field hockey and lacrosse at the University of Virginia.

Personal life
Orrison was born in Arlington County, Virginia on June 29, 1961, to Karen and Charles Orrison, and grew up in McLean. She married Everett Grant Germain III on June 21, 1986, in Fairfax, Virginia. She is the sister-in-law of fellow U.S. international Suzy Cobb Germain, who later married Everett's brother Gregory in 1989. Both players had previously featured together in a match against Canada at the 1986 North America Cup, which the Americans won 3–0 (this was Cobb Germain's only international appearance, and Orrison's final match).

See also
 1985 United States women's national soccer team

References

Further reading
 Grainey, Timothy (2012), Beyond Bend It Like Beckham: The Global Phenomenon of Women's Soccer, University of Nebraska Press, 
 Lisi, Clemente A. (2010), The U.S. Women's Soccer Team: An American Success Story, Scarecrow Press, 
 Nash, Tim (2016), ''It's Not the Glory: The Remarkable First Thirty Years of US Women's Soccer', Lulu Press, 

Living people
1961 births
Sportspeople from Arlington County, Virginia
People from McLean, Virginia
Soccer players from Virginia
Women's association football defenders
American women's soccer players
United States women's international soccer players
Virginia Cavaliers women's lacrosse players
Virginia Cavaliers field hockey players
American female field hockey players